Frank Heinrich (born 25 January 1964) is a German theologian, social pedagogue and politician of the Christian Democratic Union (CDU).

Background and education 
Heinrich was born in Siegen. At the age of three he moved to the southern part of Germany together with his family where his parents managed a retirement home. After a civil service he spent a year abroad in Canada as a divinity student. When he returned he finished his studies of social education and became a member of the Salvation Army in Freiburg im Breisgau. Until 1995 he was head of the social missionary service (Die Insel and Die Spinnwebe) as social worker. In 1997, Heinrich was fully ordained as a Salvation Army Officer. Together with his wife he was leading the Salvation Army in Chemnitz between 1997 and 2009. Frank Heinrich is married since 1987 and father of four children.

Political career 
Heinrich became a member of the Christian Democratic Union (CDU) in 2007. In the parliamentary elections in the years 2009, 2013 and 2017 he secured the direct mandate for the constituency Chemnitz. Since November 2009 Frank Heinrich has been chairman of the CDU county chapter in Chemnitz. In parliament, he served a member of the CDU/CSU parliamentary group and the group's deputy speaker on the Committee on Human Rights and Humanitarian Aid. Furthermore he was a member of the Committee on Labour and Social Affairs.

In addition to his committee assignments, Heinrich served as deputy chairman of the Parliamentary Friendship Group for Relations with the SADC States.

On 13 March 2021, Heinrich ran against Sebastian Liebold and Nora Seitz for the nomination for the Bundestag election of the CDU in Chemnitz. In the run-off, party members voted 70 to 49 in favor of him. In the 2021 federal election, he lost his direct mandate in third place after the SPD and AfD candidates.

Other activities
 Evangelical Church in Germany (EKD), Member of the Committee on Sustainable Development 
 Freiheit für die Westsahara e.V., Member of the Board of Trustees
 International Youth Meeting Center in Oświęcim/Auschwitz, Member of the Board of Trustees
 Iman Foundation, Member of the Advisory Board
 Stiftung für Grundwerte und Völkerverständigung, Member of the Board of Trustees

Political positions
Heinrich's political work focusses on his constituency Chemnitz with an emphasis on economic cooperation with Africa, infrastructure, social equality, families, children’s rights and Chemnitz as a location for research and scientific development. Moreover his working spectrum includes Africa, religious freedom and development cooperation at eye level. For establishing economic collaborations between Chemnitz and African countries, Heinrich and the Chamber of industry and commerce Chemnitz initiated the network conference “Business trifft Afrika” (“Business meets Africa”). Starting in 2014 it became an annual event.

Heinrich was one of only a few members of the CDU who voted against the lifetime extension of nuclear power plans in October 2010.
From 2012, Heinrich became involved, together with 12 other CDU colleagues, in efforts to strengthen tax equality of same-sex partnerships within the law on civil unions. In June 2017, however, he voted against Germany’s introduction of same-sex marriage.

Under the umbrella of the German parliaments’ godparenthood program for human rights activists, Heinrich has been raising awareness for the work of persecuted Colombian lawyer  since 2014.

In 2019, Heinrich joined 14 members of his parliamentary group who, in an open letter, called for the party to rally around Angela Merkel and party chairwoman Annegret Kramp-Karrenbauer amid criticism voiced by conservatives Friedrich Merz and Roland Koch.

Publications

References

External links 

 
 The website of Deutscher Bundestag/ Biography of Frank Heinrich
 The official website of Frank Heinrich

1964 births
Living people
German theologians
People from Siegen
Members of the Bundestag for Saxony
Members of the Bundestag 2017–2021
Members of the Bundestag 2013–2017
Members of the Bundestag 2009–2013
Members of the Bundestag for the Christian Democratic Union of Germany